Eugène Leveille (born 26 January 1901, date of death unknown) was a French racing cyclist. He rode in the 1923 Tour de France.

References

1901 births
Year of death missing
French male cyclists
Place of birth missing